Balagueró is a Catalan surname. Notable people with the surname include:
Gerard Moreno Balaguero (born 1992), Spanish footballer
Jaume Balagueró (born 1968), Spanish film director

See also
Balaguer (disambiguation)#People

Catalan-language surnames